Walaa Issam ElBoushi (also: Wala'a, Walla, Isam, Essam, al-Bushi, al-Boushi, el-Boushi) is a Sudanese activist who became the Sudanese Minister of Youth and Sport in early September 2019 in the Transitional Cabinet of Prime Minister Abdalla Hamdok, during the 2019 Sudanese transition to democracy.

Early life and education
Al-Boushi was born in 1986 in Wad Madani. She has a Master's degree in Advanced Engineering Mechanics from the Imperial College London.

Political activism
Al-Boushi was involved in anti-government activism in Sudan during the presidency of Omar al-Bashir, who was overthrown in the April 2019 Sudanese coup d'état.

Minister of Youth and Sport
In early September 2019, al-Boushi became the Sudanese Minister of Youth and Sport in the Transitional Cabinet of Prime Minister Abdalla Hamdok, during the 2019 Sudanese transition to democracy. Other women leaders of Sudan during the transitional period include Chief Justice Nemat Abdullah Khair, and Sovereignty Council members Aisha Musa el-Said and Raja Nicola. Al-Boushi described her nomination as being to the "Ministry of the Revolution". She expressed her enthusiasm for the position, stating,

Women's football
On 30 September 2019, a 21-team women's football league was launched under al-Boushi's ministership, with both al-Boushi and Aisha Musa present at the match between the Eltahadi and Eldifaa teams, refereed by female umpires.

An Islamist preacher and supporter of former president Omar al-Bashir, Abdal Hai Youssef, accused al-Boushi of blasphemy and apostasy for having re-introduced women's football to Sudan. Under Article 126.2 of the 1991 version of the Sudanese Penal Code, apostasy is punishable by the death sentence if the accused does not repent. Al-Boushi lodged an official complaint against Youssef. Information Minister Faisal Saleh stated that Youssef's comments constituted an attack against women's rights and said that the Sudanese cabinet requested the Ministry of Justice to take "the necessary legal measures" against Youssef.

References

1986 births
Government ministers of Sudan
Women government ministers of Sudan
Living people
People of the Sudanese Revolution
Alumni of Imperial College London
21st-century Sudanese women politicians
21st-century Sudanese politicians